Ginette Moulin (born February 1926) is a French businesswoman. She is the chairman and majority shareholder of Galeries Lafayette. She also owns 11,5% of Carrefour as well as a stake in Château Beauregard. As of 2016, Moulin and her family were worth an estimated €3 billion.

Heilbronn's father was Max Heilbronn, the founder of Monoprix, and her grandfather was Théophile Bader, co-founder of Galeries Lafayette.

References

Living people
Businesspeople from Paris
People from Carpentras
People from Var (department)
20th-century French businesswomen
20th-century French businesspeople
French billionaires
Female billionaires
Officers of the Ordre national du Mérite
Officiers of the Légion d'honneur
1926 births